South Yangon District is a district of the Yangon Region in Myanmar.

Townships
 Cocokyun
 Dala
 Kawhmu
 Khayan
 Kungyangon
 Kyauktan
 Seikkyi Kanaungto
 Thanlyin
 Thongwa
 Twante

References 

Districts of Myanmar